Zig et Puce  is a Franco-Belgian comics series created by Alain Saint-Ogan in 1925 that became popular and influential over a long period.  After ending production, it was revived by Greg for a second successful publication run.

Synopsis 
Zig and Puce, the thin and the chubby one, respectively, are two teenagers who frequently experience adventures. On an expedition to the North Pole they meet their pet auk, Alfred. Their adventures are often exotic, and occasionally fantastic in nature, leading to destinations such as Venus or the future.

Publication history
Zig et Puce first appeared in the Dimanche Illustré, weekly supplement of the French newspaper l'Excelsior, on 3 May 1925. The third major character, Alfred, made his first appearance on 25 December 1925. The series' style was influenced by the Art-Deco design of the period, and its engaging stories are suggested to be the main reason for its wide appeal among both adults and youth, and the subsequent success of the series. It is also considered the earliest French comic strip to employ speech bubbles, the device which was popularized by The Yellow Kid. After a long run of serial and album publications, Saint-Ogan ceased to produce the series in 1954.

The series was later revived by Greg who, with the consent of Saint-Ogan, resumed production in the Franco-Belgian comics magazine Tintin. It was first published on 26 March 1963 and continued serial publication until 1969.

Influences
As a seminal comic strip in the bande dessinée culture, although appearing several years after Les Pieds Nickelés, Zig et Puce made an influential impact a few years before the debut of Hergé and The Adventures of Tintin. The character of Alfred is also considered a pioneering central animal character, in the tradition of Franco-Belgian comics animals such as Milou (Snowy), Spip, Jocko, Jolly Jumper, Marsupilami and Idéfix (Dogmatix).

Alfred the auk was chosen as mascot by Charles Lindbergh when he landed in Paris on board the Spirit of St. Louis on the arrival of his first transatlantic flight in May 1927. There, an American lady gave him a plush effigy of Alfred, which Lindergh took with him in his flight from Paris to Brussels.

The character Alfred was chosen as the mascot of the 1974 Angoulême Comics Festival, and the name given to an award. The term Alfred was used until 1989 when it was renamed Alph'art (in honor of the last Adventures of Tintin comic Tintin and Alph-Art).

Albums

Alain Saint-Ogan
Lists French album titles, titles translated into English, the first year of publication in album format, and the date of republication by Glénat. At least for the first nine albums, the republished Glénat versions have between 1 and 24 pages not included in the originals.

1.  Zig et Puce (Zig and Puce), 1927, Glénat 1995.
2.  Zig et Puce millionnaires (Zig and Puce, Millionnaires), 1928, Glénat 1995.
3.  Zig, Puce et Alfred (Zig, Puce and Alfred), 1929, Glénat 1995.
4.  Zig et Puce à New-York (Zig and Puce in New York), 1930, Glénat 1995.
5.  Zig et Puce cherchent Dolly (Zig and Puce look for Dolly), 1931, Glénat 1995.
6.  Zig et Puce aux Indes (Zig and Puce in South Asia), 1932, Glénat 1995.
7.  Zig, Puce et Furette (Zig, Puce and Furette), 1933, Glénat 1996.
8.  Zig, Puce et la petite princesse (Zig, Puce and the Little Princess), 1933, Glénat 1996.
9.  Zig et Puce au XXIè siècle (Zig and Puce in the 21st Century),  1935, Glénat 1997.
10. Zig et Puce Ministres (Ministers Zig and Puce), unknown, Glénat 1997.
11. The second was republished in a separate album, Glénat 1998.
12. Zig et Puce et l'homme invisible (Zig and Puce and the Invisible Man), 1949, Glénat 1998.
13. Zig et Puce et le complot (Zig and Puce and the Conspiracy), 1950, Glénat 1999.
14. Zig et Puce et le cirque (Zig and Puce and the Circus), 1951, Glénat 1999.
15. Zig et Puce en Éthiopie (Zig and Puce in Ethiopia), 1952, Glénat 1999.
16. Zig et Puce sur Venus (Zig and Puce on Venus), unknown, Glénat 2000.
17. Zig, Puce, Nénette et la baronne Truffe (Zig, Puce, Nénette and Baroness Truffe) unknown, Glénat 2001. Multiple stories, printed under slightly different titles.

Greg
Lists French titles, titles translated into English, and the first year of publication in album format.

1.  Le voleur fantôme (The Phantom Robber), 1965.
2.  S.O.S. 'Sheila''' (S.O.S. 'Sheila' ), 1966.
3.  Le prototype Zèro-Zèro (The Zero-Zero Prototype), 1967.
4.  La pierre qui vole (The Flying Rock), 1968.
5.  Les frais de la princesse (The Princess' Expenses), 1970.
6.  Zig et Puce contre le légume boulimique (Zig and Puce versus the Bulimic Vegetable''), after 1966.

Footnotes

Sources

 Zig, Puce et Alfred publications in Belgian Tintin and French Tintin BDoubliées 
 Zig et Puce original albums and Zig et Puce second series Bedetheque

External links
 Zig et Puce on Cool French Comics

French comic strips
Adventure comics
Humor comics
Child characters in comics
Male characters in comics
1925 comics debuts
1954 comics endings
1963 comics debuts
1969 comics endings
Comic strip duos
Comics about penguins
Fictional French people
French comics characters
Comics characters introduced in 1925